Nicolas Brignoni (born 3 September 1976 in Montevideo) is a former Uruguayan rugby union player, of Swiss origin. He played as a flanker.

Career
Brignoni played in Europe for L'Aquila Rugby, from Italy, from 2002/2003 to 2005/2006, and US Montauban, from France, in 2006/2007. He played for Oyonnax Rugby, another French team, from 2007/08 to 2009/10. He last played for French side UA Libourne in the Fédérale 1, in 2014.

He holds 47 caps with 9 tries scored, 45 points in aggregate, for Uruguay national rugby union team. His first game was at 8 June 1998 in a 72-5 loss to Argentina XV, in Buenos Aires, in a tour. He played four games at the 1999 Rugby World Cup, scoring a try, and three games at the 2003 Rugby World Cup, where he scored an important try against Georgia. He had his last cap at the 21-21 draw with Romania, at 23 November 2010, for the 2011 Rugby World Cup qualification repechage, in Montevideo.

Notes

External links
Nicolas Brignoni Club Statistics

1976 births
Living people
Rugby union players from Montevideo
Uruguayan rugby union players
Uruguay international rugby union players
Rugby union wings
Oyonnax Rugby players
Expatriate rugby union players in France
Uruguayan people of Swiss-Italian descent